Grevillea linsmithii is a species of flowering plant in the family Proteaceae and is endemic to eastern Australia. It is a spreading shrub with oblong leaves, and small clusters of orange-pink to bright red flowers.

Description

Taxonomy
Grevillea linsmithii was first formally described in 1986 by Donald McGillivray in his book, New Names in Grevillea (Proteaceae) from specimens collected from Mount Greville in 1973. The specific epithet, (linsmithii), honours Lindsay Stuart Smith.

Distribution and habitat
This grevillea grows in scrub and forest in rocky places from south of Boonah in Queensland to the upper reaches of the Hastings and Forbes Rivers in north-eastern New South Wales.

Conservation status
Grevillea linsmithii is listed as "Endangered" in Queensland under the Queensland Government Nature Conservation Act 1992.

References

linsmithii
Flora of New South Wales
Flora of Queensland
Proteales of Australia
Taxa named by Donald McGillivray
Plants described in 1986